Yu Kil-chun (1856–1914) was an intellectual, writer, politician and independence activist of Korea's late Joseon Dynasty. He was also the first modern Hangeul researcher and the author of a book of travel impressions: Seoyu gyeonmun (서유견문) ("Observations on Travels in the West"). This work included the important philosophical essay, "Levels of Enlightenment." He was cherished as the "ideal Korean patriot" by the independence activist Ahn Chang-ho.

Life 

Yu was born in Seoul, in modern-day South Korea. In his early years, he studied under Park Kyu-su and Oh Kyung-suk. In 1881 he went to Meiji Japan to matriculate at Keio University for a year, studying modernization from Fukuzawa Yukichi. In 1884, he traveled to the United States as part of the first official Korean delegation to observe American industry and government and studied at the Governor Dummer Academy.

Having travelled to several European countries, he was accused of supporting the Gaehwadang (개화당, ‘enlightenment party'). In detention, he wrote a book on his experiences entitled Seoyu Gyeonmun (서유견문) ("Observations on Travels in the West"); in this book he used Korean mixed script as opposed to Literary Chinese, which was written using exclusively Chinese characters, and was the normal writing method of period literati-officialdom.

From 1894 to 1895, Yu worked for the government under Prime Minister Kim Hong-jip, who intended to modernize Korea. In 1895, he became Vice Minister of State for the Home Office. In October 1895, during the so-called Eulmi Sabyeon (을미사변, 乙未事變), the murder of Queen Min by Japanese soldiers, he was accused of co-operating with Japanese killers by Korea's King Gojong. Yu had previously written a letter describing Queen Min as ‘evil’; worse than Mary I of England and Marie Antoinette of France.

When Kim was killed and his cabinet disbanded in 1895, Yu fled the country for exile in Japan, returning to Korea only in 1907 after he was pardoned by Korea's Emperor Sunjong.

Yu wrote his "Levels of Enlightenment" after studying in both Japan and the U.S. In the book, he laid out what he believed to be an optimal track towards modernization and enlightened thought; one that dispelled class systems and championed a meritocracy based on the tireless individual pursuit of knowledge.

In 1910, when Korea was annexed by Imperial Japan, Yu started a movement against the annexation. Yu declined the Danshaku title he was awarded by the Government of Japan; the title being created by the government as part of its new Korean peerage system and designed after its own British-modeled Kazoku system.

Works 
 Seoyu gyeonmun (서유견문; 西遊見聞)

Bibliography
De Ceuster, Koen. “The World in a Book: Yu Kilchun’s Soyu kyonmun.” In Remco E. Breuker, ed. Korea in the Middle: Korean Studies and Area Studies: Essays in Honour of Boudewijn Walraven. Leiden: CNWS Publications, 2008.

References

External links
 Yu Kil-chun: 2003년 12월의 문화 인물  – Ministry of Culture, Sports and Tourism 
 Yu Kil-chun 
 Yu Kil-chun  – daum.net 
 Yu Kil-chun  

Korean politicians
Japan–Korea relations
1856 births
1914 deaths
19th-century Korean people
The Governor's Academy alumni
Korean independence activists
Officials of the Korean Empire
Politicians of the Korean Empire
People from Seoul